This is a list of the heritage sites in Limpopo as recognised by the South African Heritage Resources Agency.

|}

References 

Lists of heritage sites in South Africa
Heritage sites
Tourist attractions in Limpopo